= Bundesbahn =

Bundesbahn may refer to:

- Deutsche Bundesbahn
- Österreichische Bundesbahn
- Schweizerische Bundesbahnen
